Panagiotis "Takis" Papageorgopoulos (Greek: Τάκης Παπαγεωργόπουλος; 1934 – 23 October 2015) was a Greek Army general who was a central figure in the so-called ASPIDA affair.

Following the restoration of democracy in Greece, he served as Member of Parliament for PASOK from 1977 until 1985 and from 1986 until 1989.

References

1934 births
2015 deaths
Greek politicians
Greek generals
Military personnel from Patras
Politicians from Patras